South Molton is a town in Devon, England. It is part of the North Devon local government district. The town is on the River Mole. According to the 2001 census the civil parish of South Molton had a population of 4,093, increasing to 5,108 at the 2011 Census. The town also has an electoral ward with the same name. The population of this ward at the same census was 4,875 We have therefore the unusual situation where the town is larger than the ward.
The town was one of the boroughs reformed by the Municipal Reform Act 1835. It retained this status as a municipal borough until 1967, when it became a rural borough in the South Molton Rural District.

South Molton is a well-built market town trading mostly in sheep and cattle. There are many geriatrics living here, 90% of them cannot drive to save their lives. There was a station on the Devon Railway until 1966, when the branch line was finally closed. The station was described in detail in the best selling railway publication the Country Railway. It is situated on the southern side of Exmoor just off the North Devon link road, which in part follows the route of the railway line.

History
The Hundred of South Molton was a pre-norman administrative centre overseeing the estates of: South Molton, Bishops Tawton, Bray, Bremeridge, Aller, Molland, Anstey, Swimbridge, Ringcombe, Newton, Whitstone, Knowstone, George Nympton, Honiton, North Aller, Hacche, Radworthy, Pulham, Satterleigh, Chittlehampton, Wadham and Swimbridge.

"In South Molton hundred there are 22 hides." (roughly 2640 acres)

References to South Molton as an estate in the 1086 Domesday Book (Exon),

"The king has 1 estate which is called South Molton, which King Eadweard held on the day that he himself was alive and dead. In that estate is 1 virgate and a half of land. 40 ploughs can plough this. There the king has 1 plough and the villans have 20 ploughs. There the king 〈has〉 12 villans and 4 bordars and 2 slaves and 12 swineherds and 9 beasts and woodland 1 league in length and 3 furlongs in width, and 10 acres of meadow and 30 acres of grazing-land; and it pays 10 pounds a year by weight."

To this estate has been added half a virgate of land, called Ringedona; and it is worth 5 shillings a year."

"In South Molton, the king’s estate, 4 clerks (priests) have 1 virgate of land, which they hold in alms from the king; and it is worth twenty shillings a year." Domesday Book

"In the hundred of South Molton there is 1 ferding of land which 1 plough can plough and it is lying completely ruined. None of the men claims this." Domesday Book

On 14 March 1655, Sir John Penruddock was captured after a three-hour street fight in South Molton by soldiers of the New Model Army under the command of Captain Unton Croke. This ended the Penruddock uprising, a conspiracy to restore Charles II to the throne of England.

In 1770 William Turner moved from South Molton to London to trade as a barber and wig maker. Around 1775 he had a son Joseph Mallord William Turner who lived in covent Garden until he was ten years old when he was sent to live with uncles in Brentford. J M W Turner later went on to become one of Englands most famous painters.

Education
There are good local educational facilities, South Molton Community College which is a state secondary school rated as a specialist technology college.

South Molton Primary School was one of the schools studied in the 1950s by Iona and Peter Opie.

Notable buildings

The Guildhall, constructed between 1739 and 1741, contains many ornamental features and entire rooms from Stowe House in Cornwall, built by the Earl of Bath in 1675 and dismantled in 1739. The building is a Grade I listed building on the Register of Historic England. Behind it is the town's Pannier Market.

Hugh Squier

Hugh Squier (1625–1710), a wealthy local merchant, was a great benefactor of South Molton. Son of William Squier of Townhouse, now a farmhouse about 1 mile west of the town, he made his fortune in London and returned home at the age of 29. He purchased the lordship of the manor of South Molton, which feudal position entitled him to the fees and tolls levied at the town's markets and fairs.

His children all died young and having no heirs he thus decided to devote his wealth to philanthropical causes in his native town. In 1686 he built and endowed a grammar school in East Street, South Molton, known as Hugh Squier's Free School. The original Deed of Endowment and Appointment of Trustees is held at North Devon Record Office in Barnstaple. In 1877 it was amalgamated with the Blue Coat School, founded in 1711, and with the National Schools, founded in 1833. The combined school was known as South Molton United School.

At his death, he left £2,314 to the Corporation of South Molton for cleansing and repairing the streets, along with bequests from his estate in the parish of Swimbridge and the rectory of North Molton which he had acquired. A contemporary portrait of him exists in the Mayor's Parlour in the Town Hall, and a stone bust of him made in 1910, apparently copied from the painting, is displayed on the facade of the same building. A medallion portrait of him hangs from the chain of office of the mayor.

See also
South Molton (UK Parliament constituency) (1885–1950)
Mayor of South Molton

References

External links
South Molton Tourist Association

 
Towns in Devon
North Devon